Katerina Georgiadou (born 1982 in Thessaloniki, Greece) is a former Miss Greece and fashion model who has appeared in fashion magazines and international events.

Background
Georgiadou lives in Argyroupoli (Greek:Αργυρούπολη). She studied classical ballet and gymnastics for eight years at the University of Gymnastics in Athens. Upon he engagement to Stathis Tavlaridis in 2007, it was announced that she would give up modeling, and the couple was married in 2009. They have a daughter named Anastasia. The couple divorced in 2014.

Career
Georgiadou won the 2002 title of Miss Hellas at the Miss Star Hellas pageant and went on to represent her country as Miss Greece in the Miss World pageant held in London. The pageant originally was going to be held in Abuja, Nigeria but was moved to London when violence broke out and more than 100 people died in riots provoked by the contest when existing religious tensions between Christians and Muslims erupted.

She was also a volunteer at the 2004 Summer Olympics.

References

External links

1981 births
Living people
Greek female models
Models from Thessaloniki
Miss World 2002 delegates
Greek beauty pageant winners